In archaeology, a  racloir, also known as racloirs sur talon (French for scraper on the platform), is a certain type of flint tool made by prehistoric peoples.

It is a type of side scraper distinctive of Mousterian assemblages. It is created from a flint flake and looks like a large scraper. As well as being used for scraping hides and bark, it may also have been used as a knife. Racloirs are most associated with the Neanderthal Mousterian industry. These racloirs are retouched along the ridge between the striking platform and the dorsal face. They have shaped edges and are modified by abrupt flaking from the dorsal face.

References

Archaeological artefact types
Lithics
Mousterian